James Conley may refer to:
James D. Conley, bishop of the Roman Catholic Diocese of Lincoln, Nebraska
Jim Conley, associated with the murder trial of Leo Frank
James Conley (baseball)
James Conley (trade unionist) (1850–c. 1922), British trade unionist
James Conley, actor in Madame Du Barry (1917 film)